Dannielle Engle is an American biologist and assistant professor of the regulatory biology laboratory at the Salk Institute for Biological Studies. Engle’s research aims at improving detection and treatment of pancreatic cancer.

Early life and education 
Engle started her undergraduate degree at Northwestern University in music as a violinist.  She then changed her path to explore biology and conducted undergraduate research in genetics studying fruit flies. Engle graduated from Northwestern with degrees in both biological sciences and asian studies.  After her undergraduate degree, Engle pursued graduate school at the University of California San Diego. During this time, Engle lost her father to pancreatic cancer and decided to dedicate her career to pancreatic cancer research. She joined the lab of Dr. Geoffrey M. Walh at the Salk Institute for Biological Studies in order to begin her career in cancer biology studying the mammogenesis in stem cells due to the similarity in cellular processes to cancer progression. After graduate school, Engle moved to the United Kingdom to complete her postdoctoral studies under the mentorship of Dr. David Tuveson at the Cambridge Research Institute but she finished her time in the lab back in the United States after helping move the lab to Cold Spring Harbour Laboratory where she held the title of Senior Research Fellow and became a Lustgarten Foundation Pancreatic Cancer Research Laboratory Ambassador through her community outreach efforts. During her postdoctoral studies, Engle focused her efforts on probing a specific carbohydrate antigen, CA19-9, released by pancreatic tumor cells. She also pioneered studies of pancreatic cancer in organoid pancreas models.

Career and research 
In 2019, Engle returned to the Salk as an assistant professor. Her lab is focused on improving detection and treatment of pancreatic cancer which has the highest mortality rate of all major cancers. Since starting in 2019, Engle’s lab has begun creating transgenic mouse models of pancreatic cancer that have tumors that express the uniquely human CA19-9 tumor antigen. This will allow the lab to better recapitulate the human tumor environment and move towards better diagnostics and treatments for pancreatic cancer.

Awards and honours 

 2019 Skip Viragh Pancreatic Cancer Action Network Career Development Award
 2016 - 2018 NIH NCI Career Transition K99/R00 Award
 2009 -2011 California Breast Cancer Research Program Fellowship
 2005 - 2009 UCSD Chancellor’s Fellowship
 Theodore T Puck Award

Select publications 

 Ponz-Sarvise, M., Corbo, V., Tiriac, H., Engle, D.D., Frese, K.K., Oni, T.E., Hwang, C.I., Öhlund, D., Chio, I.I.C., Baker, L.A., Filippini, D., Wright, K., Bapiro, T.E., Huang, P.S., Smith, P.D., Yu, K.H., Jodrell, D.I., Park, Y., Tuveson, D.A. Identification of Resistance Pathways Specific to Malignancy Using Organoid Models of Pancreatic Cancer. (2019) Clinical Cancer Research. DOI: 10.1158/1078-0432.CCR-19-1398
 Elyada, E., Bolisetty, M., Laise, P., Flynn, W.F., Courtois, E.T., Burkhart, R.A., Teinor, J.A., Belleau, P., Biffi, G., Lucito, M.S., Sivajothi, S., Armstrong, T.D., Engle, D.D., Yu, K.H., Hao, Y., Wolfgang, C.L., Park, Y., Preall, J., Jaffee, E.M., Califano, A., Robson, P., Tuveson, D.A. Cross-Species Single-Cell Analysis of Pancreatic Ductal Adenocarcinoma Reveals Antigen-Presenting Cancer-Associated Fibroblasts. (2019) Cancer Discovery. 9(8):1102-1123. DOI: 10.1158/2159-8290.CD-19-0094
 Engle, D.D., Tiriac, H., Rivera, K.D., Pommier, A., Whalen, S., Oni, T.E., Alagesan, B., Lee, E.J., Yao, M.A., Lucito, M.S., Spielman, B., Da Silva, B., Schoepfer, C., Wright, K., Creighton, B., Afinowicz, L., Yu, K.H., Grützmann, R., Aust, D., Gimotty, P.A., Pollard, K.S., Hruban, R.H., Goggins, M.G., Pilarsky, C., Park, Y., Pappin, D.J., Hollingsworth, M.A., Tuveson, D.A. The glycan CA19-9 promotes pancreatitis and pancreatic cancer in mice. (2019) Science. 364(6446):1156-1162. DOI: 10.1126/science.aaw3145
 Tiriac, H., Belleau, P.*, Engle, D.D.*, Plenker, D., Deschênes, A., Somerville, T.D.D., Froeling, F.E.M., Burkhart, R.A., Denroche, R.E., Jang, G.H., Miyabayashi, K., Young, C.M., Patel, H., Ma, M., LaComb, J.F., Palmaira, R.L.D., Javed, A.A., Huynh, J.C., Johnson, M., Arora, K., Robine, N., Shah, M., Sanghvi, R., Goetz, A.B., Lowder, C.Y., Martello, L., Driehuis, E., LeComte, N., Askan, G., Iacobuzio-Donahue, C.A., Clevers, H., Wood, L.D., Hruban, R.H., Thompson, E., Aguirre, A.J., Wolpin, B.M., Sasson, A., Kim, J., Wu, M., Bucobo, J.C., Allen, P., Sejpal, D.V., Nealon, W., Sullivan, J.D., Winter, J.M., Gimotty, P.A., Grem, J.L., DiMaio, D.J., Buscaglia, J.M., Grandgenett, P.M., Brody, J.R., Hollingsworth, M.A., O’Kane, G.M., Notta, F., Kim, E., Crawford, J.M., Devoe, C., Ocean, A., Wolfgang, C.L., Yu, K.H., Li, E., Vakoc, C.R., Hubert, B., Fischer, S.E., Wilson, J.M., Moffitt, R., Knox, J., Krasnitz, A., Gallinger, S., Tuveson, D.A. Organoid Profiling Identifies Common Responders to Chemotherapy in Pancreatic Cancer. (2018) Cancer Discovery. 8(9):1112-1129. DOI: 10.1158/2159-8290.CD-18-0349
 Quaranta, V., Rainer, C., Nielsen, S.R., Raymant, M.L., Ahmed, M.S., Engle, D.D., Taylor, A., Murray, T., Campbell, F., Palmer, D.H., Tuveson, D.A., Mielgo, A., Schmid, M.C. Macrophage-Derived Granulin Drives Resistance to Immune Checkpoint Inhibition in Metastatic Pancreatic Cancer. (2018) Cancer Research. 78(15):4253-4269. DOI: 10.1158/0008-5472.CAN-17-3876
 Wolff, R.A.*, Wang-Gillam, A.*, Alvarez, H.*, Tiriac, H.*, Engle, D.*, Hou, S.*, Groff, A.F., San Lucas, A., Bernard, V., Allenson, K., Castillo, J., Kim, D., Mulu, F., Huang, J., Stephens, B., Wistuba, I.I., Katz, M., Varadhachary, G., Park, Y., Hicks, J., Chinnaiyan, A., Scampavia, L., Spicer, T., Gerhardinger, C., Maitra, A., Tuveson, D., Rinn, J., Lizee, G., Yee, C., Levine, A.J. Dynamic changes during the treatment of pancreatic cancer. (2018) Oncotarget. 9(19):14764-14790. DOI: 10.18632/oncotarget.24483
 Öhlund, D., Handly-Santana, A., Biffi, G., Elyada, E., Almeida, A.S., Ponz-Sarvise, M., Corbo, V., Oni, T.E., Hearn, S.A., Lee, E.J., Chio, I.I., Hwang, C.I., Tiriac, H., Baker, L.A., Engle, D.D., Feig, C., Kultti, A., Egeblad, M., Fearon, D.T., Crawford, J.M., Clevers, H., Park, Y., Tuveson, D.A. Distinct populations of inflammatory fibroblasts and myofibroblasts in pancreatic cancer. (2017) Journal of Experimental Medicine. 214(3):579-596. DOI: 10.1084/jem.20162024
 Ireland, L., Santos, A., Ahmed, M.S., Rainer, C., Nielsen, S.R., Quaranta, V., Weyer-Czernilofsky, U., Engle, D.D., Perez-Mancera, P.A., Coupland, S.E., Taktak, A., Bogenrieder, T., Tuveson, D.A., Campbell, F., Schmid, M.C., Mielgo, A. Chemoresistance in Pancreatic Cancer Is Driven by Stroma-Derived Insulin-Like Growth Factors. (2016) Cancer Research. 76(23):6851-6863. DOI: 10.1158/0008-5472.CAN-16-1201
 Nielsen, S.R., Quaranta, V., Linford, A., Emeagi, P., Rainer, C., Santos, A., Ireland, L., Sakai, T., Sakai, K., Kim, Y.S., Engle, D., Campbell, F., Palmer, D., Ko, J.H., Tuveson, D.A., Hirsch, E., Mielgo, A., Schmid, M.C. Macrophage-secreted granulin supports pancreatic cancer metastasis by inducing liver fibrosis. (2016) Nature Cell Biology. 18(5):549-60. DOI: 10.1038/ncb3340
 Seifert, L., Werba, G., Tiwari, S., Giao Ly, N.N., Alothman, S., Alqunaibit, D., Avanzi, A., Barilla, R., Daley, D., Greco, S.H., Torres-Hernandez, A., Pergamo, M., Ochi, A., Zambirinis, C.P., Pansari, M., Rendon, M., Tippens, D., Hundeyin, M., Mani, V.R., Hajdu, C., Engle, D., Miller, G. The necrosome promotes pancreatic oncogenesis via CXCL1 and Mincle-induced immune suppression. (2016) Nature. 532(7598):245-9. DOI: 10.1038/nature17403
 Boj, S.F., Hwang, C.I., Baker, L.A., Engle, D.D., Tuveson, D.A., Clevers, H. Model organoids provide new research opportunities for ductal pancreatic cancer. (2016) Molecular & Cellular Oncology. 3(1):e1014757. DOI: 10.1080/23723556.2015.1014757
 Zambirinis, C.P., Levie, E., Nguy, S., Avanzi, A., Barilla, R., Xu, Y., Seifert, L., Daley, D., Greco, S.H., Deutsch, M., Jonnadula, S., Torres-Hernandez, A., Tippens, D., Pushalkar, S., Eisenthal, A., Saxena, D., Ahn, J., Hajdu, C., Engle, D.D., Tuveson, D., Miller, G. TLR9 ligation in pancreatic stellate cells promotes tumorigenesis. (2015) J. Exp. Med. 212(12):2077-94. DOI: 10.1084/jem.20142162
 Roy, I., McAllister, D.M., Gorse, E., Dixon, K., Piper, C.T., Zimmerman, N.P., Getschman, A.E., Tsai, S., Engle, D.D., Evans, D.B., Volkman, B.F., Kalyanaraman, B., Dwinell, M.B. Pancreatic Cancer Cell Migration and Metastasis Is Regulated by Chemokine-Biased Agonism and Bioenergetic Signaling. (2015) Cancer Research. 75(17):3529-42. DOI: 10.1158/0008-5472.CAN-14-2645
 Boj, S.F.*, Hwang, C.I.*, Baker, L.A.*, Chio, I.I.*, Engle, D.D.*, Corbo, V.*, Jager, M.*, Ponz-Sarvise, M., Tiriac, H., Spector, M.S., Gracanin, A., Oni, T., Yu, K.H., van Boxtel, R., Huch, M., Rivera, K.D., Wilson, J.P., Feigin, M.E., Öhlund, D., Handly-Santana, A., Ardito-Abraham, C.M., Ludwig, M., Elyada, E., Alagesan, B., Biffi, G., Yordanov, G.N., Delcuze, B., Creighton, B., Wright, K., Park, Y., Morsink, F.H., Molenaar, I.Q., Borel Rinkes, I.H., Cuppen, E., Hao, Y., Jin, Y., Nijman, I.J., Iacobuzio-Donahue, C., Leach, S.D., Pappin, D.J., Hammell, M., Klimstra, D.S., Basturk, O., Hruban, R.H., Offerhaus, G.J., Vries, R.G., Clevers, H., Tuveson, D.A. Organoid models of human and mouse ductal pancreatic cancer. (2015) Cell. 160(1-2):324-38. DOI: 10.1016/j.cell.2014.12.021
 Naguib, A., Bencze, G., Engle, D.D., Chio, I.I., Herzka, T., Watrud, K., Bencze, S., Tuveson, D.A., Pappin, D.J., Trotman, L.C. p53 mutations change phosphatidylinositol acyl chain composition. (2015) Cell Reports. 10(1):8-19. DOI: 10.1016/j.celrep.2014.12.010
 Sherman, M.H., Yu, R.T., Engle, D.D., Ding, N., Atkins, A.R., Tiriac, H., Collisson, E.A., Connor, F., Van Dyke, T., Kozlov, S., Martin, P., Tseng, T.W., Dawson, D.W., Donahue, T.R., Masamune, A., Shimosegawa, T., Apte, M.V., Wilson, J.S., Ng, B., Lau, S.L., Gunton, J.E., Wahl, G.M., Hunter, T., Drebin, J.A., O’Dwyer, P.J., Liddle, C., Tuveson, D.A., Downes, M., Evans, R.M. Vitamin D receptor-mediated stromal reprogramming suppresses pancreatitis and enhances pancreatic cancer therapy. (2014) Cell. 159(1):80-93. DOI: 10.1016/j.cell.2014.08.007
 Spike, B.T.*, Engle, D.D.*, Lin, J.C., Cheung, S.K., La, J., Wahl, G.M. A mammary stem cell population identified and characterized in late embryogenesis reveals similarities to human breast cancer. (2012) Cell Stem Cell. 10(2):183-97. DOI: 10.1016/j.stem.2011.12.018
 Wang, Y.V., Leblanc, M., Fox, N., Mao, J.H., Tinkum, K.L., Krummel, K., Engle, D., Piwnica-Worms, D., Piwnica-Worms, H., Balmain, A., Kaushansky, K., Wahl, G.M. Fine-tuning p53 activity through C-terminal modification significantly contributes to HSC homeostasis and mouse radiosensitivity. (2011) Genes & Development. 25(13):1426-38. DOI: 10.1101/gad.2024411

References 

Living people
21st-century American biologists
Northwestern University alumni
University of California, San Diego alumni
Year of birth missing (living people)